The 1971–72 English football season was Villa's 73rd season in the Football League, this season playing in the Football League Third Division. Under manager Vic Crowe  Aston Villa won promotion to the Second Division as champions with a record 70 points, and thus ended their two-year spell in the Third Division. By the end of the decade they would be firmly re-established as a First Division club.

In July 1971, Ray Graydon secured a £50,000 move from third division Bristol Rovers, with captain Brian Godfrey moving in the opposite direction.  Graydon  missed just one of Villa's 46 league games in the 1971–72 season, scoring 14 goals as the club secured the Third Division title with a five-point margin over Brighton & Hove Albion.

Willie Anderson's contribution included scoring a career high fifteen goals in all competitions with eight coming from penalties, helping him gain a reputation as a penalty taker specialist.

Third Division

Diary
20 November 1971: As a third division club Villa were required to compete in the first round joined those non-league clubs having come through the qualifying rounds. Villa were knocked out by Fourth Division Southend.
31 March 1972: Third Division table-toppers Aston Villa pull away from A.F.C. Bournemouth.

References

External links
AVFC History: 1971-72 season

Aston Villa F.C. seasons
Aston Villa F.C. season